Essity AB is a global hygiene and health company, with its headquarters in Stockholm, Sweden. The products portfolio contains one-use products such as tissue paper, baby diapers, feminine care (menstruation pads etc.), incontinence products, compression therapy, orthopedics and wound care. Essity was a part of the hygiene and forest products company SCA until 2017, when the company spun off the hygiene operations that became listed as a separate company on Nasdaq Stockholm.

Essity has approximately 46,000 employees and net sales in 2019 amounted to EUR 12.2 billion. The name Essity stems from the words essentials and necessity.

History
Essity is formerly a part of the SCA group.

SCA was founded in 1929 as a forestry company. In 1975, SCA acquired Mölnlycke AB, a western European producer of disposable hygiene products.

In 1995 they acquired the German paper and packaging company PWA, Papierwerke Waldhof-Aschaffenburg.

In 2001 the division Wisconsin Tissue of the United States company Georgia-Pacific Tissue was acquired.

In 2004 SCA acquired the tissue and hygiene products businesses of Carter Holt Harvey from International Paper.

In 2007, Procter & Gamble sold their European tissue business to SCA for €512 million ($672 million).

In 2007 SCA acquired its first minority share in the Asian tissue company Vinda.

In 2011, it acquired the Brazilian Pro Descart for about R$114 million, with local brands Biofral and Drybaby. Later, it invested R$242 million in a plant in Jarinu, in the interior of São Paulo, consolidating the brands TENA and Tork.

In July 2012, the acquisition of Georgia Pacific's tissue operations, including the brand Lotus, was closed. The total price amounted to €1.32 billion.

In 2013 SCA became majority shareholder in Vinda.

In 2015, SCA was the largest producer of tissue paper in the world.

In August 2015 it was announced that SCA's hygiene operations and forestry operations were to be divided into two different divisions. A year later, 24 August 2016, the company announced that it intended to split the SCA into two separately listed companies. In December 2016 SCA announced the acquisition of BSN Medical, a company specializing in the areas of Compression Therapy, Wound Care and Orthopaedics. The purchase price amounted to €2740 million and included brands such as Jobst, Leukoplast, Cutimed, Delta Cast and Actimove. In 2017, SCA split off Essity as a separate company, and Essity listed on the Stock Exchange in Stockholm on June 15, 2017.

Brands 

 Libresse
 Plenty
 Tempo
OKAY (France and Belgium)
 TENA
 JOBST
 Leukoplast
 
 Tork
 Vinda
 Zewa
 Cushelle
 Saba, from a company of the same name which became part of Essity
 Familia (Latin America)
 Regio (Mexico)

Competitors 
Essity is amongst the top 50 largest fast-moving consumer goods companies in the world and some of its competitors are Unilever, Procter & Gamble, Georgia-Pacific, Kimberly-Clark, Sofidel, Unicharm Ontex, CMPC, Santher and 3M.

Sustainability messaging
Several initiatives have been launched to influence messaging around the sustainability of the Essity business model:
a science-based target for emissions reduction in line with climate science was approved in 2018.
The company has qualified for inclusion in both the Dow Jones Sustainability World Index and Sustainability Europe Index, and has also been named industry leader in the household products sector.
Company representatives participate in the Ellen MacArthur Foundation's  "New Plastics Economy" initiative and have committed to sustainability targets for packaging, for example that 85% of the company's packaging is to be manufactured from renewable or recycled material by 2025.

Criticism 
Along with its supplier SCA, Essity was accused by Greenpeace of promoting unsustainable business practices aggravating global warming and mass extinction. Greenpeace claim that Essity "clearcuts some of Sweden’s last remaining old-growth forests, wiping away habitats of threatened species and endangering the livelihood of indigenous communities".

In late August 2022, Essity announced their intention to sue lockedout striking workers at a paper-mill in Kawerau, New Zealand, for ~$580,000 NZD because they began their strike an hour earlier than stated. The strike began in early August over a pay dispute, and involved 145 workers.

References

External links
 
Essity- Forbes

SCA (company)
Multinational companies headquartered in Sweden
Pulp and paper companies of Sweden
Personal care companies
Swedish brands
Companies listed on Nasdaq Stockholm
Manufacturing companies based in Stockholm
Manufacturing companies established in 2017
Swedish companies established in 2017
Corporate spin-offs